The following is a list of Radio Disney Music Award winners and nominees for Song to Dance to (formerly Best Song to Dance).

Winners and nominees

2000s

2010s

References

Song to Dance to
Song awards